Brad Paquette (born May 24, 1987) is a Republican member of the Michigan House of Representatives.

Early life and education 
Paquette was born on May 24, 1987 in Marquette, Michigan. In 2009, Paquette graduated from Northern Michigan University, earning a B.A. in political science and pre-law. In 2012, Paquette earned a master's degree in teaching from Andrews University.

Career 
Paquette has worked as a public school educator, teaching at the Niles New Tech Entrepreneurial Academy. Paquette has also served on the Niles Planning Commission. On November 6, 2018, Paquette was elected to the Michigan House of Representatives, where he has been representing the 78th district ever since he was sworn in to office in 2019. As a legislator, Paquette has introduced legislation that aimed to remove concealed pistol license renewal fees. Paquette has been vocal critic of Michigan Governor Gretchen Whitmer's handling of the COVID-19 pandemic in the state of Michigan, thinking that her stay-at-home executive orders were excessive. Paquette is seeking re-election in the 2020 Michigan House of Representatives election. Paquette was unopposed in the August 4, 2020 Republican primary for his seat. In the general election, Paquette is running against Democratic nominee Dan VandenHeede and Natural Law Party candidate Andrew Warner.

On October 10, 2021, Paquette co-sponsored House Bill 5444 also known as the "fetal heartbeat protection act."

References 

Living people
1987 births
Northern Michigan University alumni
Republican Party members of the Michigan House of Representatives
People from Marquette, Michigan
21st-century American politicians